Chung Hua Sheng Kung Hui (CHSKH), known in English as the Holy Catholic Church in China or Anglican-Episcopal Province of China, was the name of the Anglican Church in China from 1912 until about 1958.

History 

The Chung Hua Sheng Kung Hui was established on 26 April 1912 by the merger of the various mission activities of the Church of England, the Episcopal Church of the United States, Anglican Church of Canada and other Anglican provinces into one autonomous jurisdiction. The merger of the respective Anglican missionary initiatives in China into one national church echoed similar steps that were taken in 1887 to establish the Nippon Sei Ko Kai or Anglican Church in Japan.

After 1949, its dioceses in Hong Kong and Macao became the Anglican Diocese of Hong Kong and Macao, later reorganized as an independent Anglican province, the Hong Kong Sheng Kung Hui. Those who fled to Taiwan with the Chinese Nationalists established the Episcopal Diocese of Taiwan, a diocese of the Episcopal Church of the United States. The CHSKH was never formally dissolved, but all activities had ended by 1958.

Anglican mission initiatives in China prior to 1912

 Church of England missionary initiatives referred to as The Church in China (1849–1912)
 Episcopal Church missionary initiatives referred to as the Protestant Episcopal Church Mission (1835–1912)

Education 

 Two major universities--Boone University (later called Central China Normal University in 1924) and St. John's University were established for higher education

Dioceses

Victoria Diocese (1842) had the church of St. John's Cathedral, Hong Kong
Hong Kong-Macao Diocese (South China Mission, 1849)
Che Kiang Diocese (Chekiang Mission, 1872) had the church of Holy Trinity Cathedral, Shanghai under the  Bishop of Chekiang.
Hua Pei Diocese (1880) had the churches of Holy Saviour's Cathedral - the Diocesan Cathedral) in Beijing, All Saints' Church in Tianjin, and Dalian Anglican Church in Dalian.
Hua Hsi Diocese (West China Mission, 1895) had the Gospel Church in Guanghan, Gospel Church in Jiangyou, Gospel Church in Mianyang, Gospel Church and St Thomas' Church in Mianzhu, Gospel Church in Wanzhou (Chongqing), St John's Church in Chengdu, St John's Cathedral and Trinity Church in Langzhong
Shantung or Shan Tung Diocese was a missionary diocese of the Church of England in China. Formerly part of the Church of England North China Mission, it was erected into a diocesan see in 1901 when it was separated from the missionary diocese of North China which traced its origins to the mission established in 1872. By 1903, the new diocese was centred on the Church of England mission known as T'aian-Fu, Shantung Mission, 1903. The first bishop of the diocese Geoffrey Durnford Iliff, consecrated in 1903) had a cathedral church at Tai-an-Fu built of local granite in 1913, and consecrated in 1915. He was succeeded by Thomas Arnold Scott in 1921. Scott served the diocese until 1940, when he was translated to the diocese of North China. The third and last bishop before nationalisation took place after the victory of the Chinese Communists was John Wellington. His bishopric lasted 1940 to 1950, but he was interned by the Japanese during much of that time only being released at the conclusion of World War II. In addition to the cathedral, the earlier mission church and school was built at Tai-an in 1886 with funds from the Society for the Propagation of the Gospel in Foreign Parts. The church's property was handed to the Three-Self Patriotic Movement, Communist China's official Protestant church, in the 1950s, and designated a national historic landmark in 1994. In 2010, the church's fate became a matter of bitter controversy when local government officials and developers attempted to demolish the church in the face of the active opposition of the local congregation.
Fu Kien Diocese (Fukien Mission, 1906)
Kui Hsiang Diocese (Kwangsi-Hunan Mission, 1909)
Yun Kui Diocese (Yunnan-Kuichou Mission, 1947) — the first bishop, was consecrated on 3 August 1947 at St. John's Cathedral, Hong Kong by Ronald Hall

Mo-Yung In was consecrated a bishop on 25 March 1950, to serve as Bishop of Guangzhou/Guangdong, in preparation for the severing of the Hong Kong diocese from the Chinese church.

Church in China

The Church in China is the name by which Anglican Missions under the jurisdiction of the Church of England were called between 1849 and 1949. Bishops' jurisdictions included
Shensi
Chekiang
Diocese of North China
Szechwan
Shantung
Fukien
Honan (Henan)
Kwangsi and Hunan
Mid-China
Diocese of Western China

Jurisdictions 
The Anglican Church in China was divided into eleven jurisdictions as of 1913.

See also

 Christianity in China
 Protestantism in China
 Anglicanism in Sichuan
 Anglican diocese of Shanghai
 Anglican Diocese of Hong Kong and Macao
 Bishop of Victoria, Hong Kong
 Anglican Communion
 Hong Kong Sheng Kung Hui
 Taiwan Episcopal Church
 Church of England Zenana Missionary Society

References

External links
 CSCA Chung Hua Sheng Kung Hui Source Documents
 A Short History of Chung Hua Sheng Kung Hui (in Chinese)
 Historical documents on Anglicanism in China from Project Canterbury

Anglican Communion church bodies
Anglicanism in China
History of Christianity in China